Lisa-Marie Breton (born August 3, 1977) is an assistant coach with Les Canadiennes de Montréal (formerly Montreal Stars). For the 2010–11 Montreal CWHL season, Breton is the team captain. Breton has also competed for the Canada women's national inline hockey team, capturing a gold medal for Canada at the 2005 FIRS Inline Hockey World Championships in Paris, France.

Breton started playing hockey at the age of six. She is a co-founder of the CWHL, has served as a  board member and continues to work relentlessly to further develop the world's top women's hockey league. She complements this dedication with a career as the strength and conditioning manager for all the varsity teams at Concordia University. As captain of the Montréal team, she feels that her teammates' enjoyment of playing with Montréal is as important as the success of the team.

Playing career
Breton attended Cégep de Trois-Rivières,  and was allowed to play for UQTR Patriotes as part of a league made up of other Cegeps and universities throughout the province. Breton was invited to the 2000-01 Hockey Canada National Development Camp. Also a member of the Canada women's national inline hockey team, winning a gold medal at the 2005 FIRS Inline Hockey World Championships in Paris, France.

Team Quebec
At fifteen years of age, she was recruited by Team Quebec at the junior level and played in the first ever National Junior Championship for hockey in 1993. The team won a silver medal in a loss to Team Ontario. Breton represented Team Quebec in numerous tournaments. In 2000, she played with Kim St. Pierre and Nancy Drolet as part of Team Quebec at the 2000 Esso Nationals. Her club team, the Montreal Axion earned the right to represent Quebec as the club competed at the 2005 Esso Nationals.

Concordia Stingers
Breton joined Concordia for the 1997-98 season, and went to five National championships with the Stingers. In her rookie year, the CIS recognized women's hockey. The Stingers were granted their first National Championship, which was held at Concordia. Breton was part of the squad that won the 1999 National Championship, but her club was beaten in the 2000 semi-finals by the University of Alberta by a 4-3 tally. That year, the Stingers took third place. In the 2000-01 season, Breton led the Quebec Student Sports Federation with eight goals and six assists in just six games.

Breton was an All-Canadian in 2000-01 season with the Concordia University Stingers, a team that she captained during her last two seasons. In her university hockey career, she has participated in five Canadian Interuniversity Sport Championship finals.

Montreal Axion
In 2006, Breton was part of the Montreal Axion club that beat the Brampton Thunder by a 1-0 mark to claim the NWHL Championship Cup. Breton scored the game-winning goal. The stick she used to score the game-winning goal was given to the Hockey Hall of Fame.

Montreal Stars
Breton was part of an initiative to start the CWHL. The league was spearheaded by players such as Allyson Fox, Kathleen Kauth, Kim McCullough, along with national team members Sami Jo Small and Jennifer Botterill. The players worked with a group of volunteer business people to form the CWHL by following the example of the National Lacrosse League. The league would be responsible for all travel, ice rental and uniform costs, plus some equipment.  Breton would become the general manager and head of public relations for the Montreal Stars. On March 19, 2009, Breton was part of the Stars team that openly played for the Clarkson Cup for the first time. Montreal beat the Minnesota Whitecaps to claim the Cup. Former Canadian Governor General Adrienne Clarkson was on hand to present the trophy to team captain Breton.

Breton was part of an initiative to raise money for breast cancer research. On January 29, 2011, the Montreal Stars wore pink jerseys as they played the Boston Blades as part of a fundraiser. Breton's mother Johanne Breton survived the disease.

During the 2010-11 season, Breton scored 8 goals and added 3 assists. She captained the Stars to their second Clarkson Cup Championship win in three years. On January 11, 2014, Breton, a CWHL co-founder registered the 100th point of her career.

On December 13, 2014, Breton was selected to participate in the 1st Canadian Women's Hockey League All-Star Game. Suiting up for Team Red, she would score a goal in the third period on Team White's Geneviève Lacasse with Blake Bolden & Ann-Sophie Bettez assisting on said goal.

The final goal of her CWHL career took place in a 5-2 win against the Calgary Inferno on February 1, 2015. Scoring a third period goal against Camille Trautman, the assists on said goal were credited to Fannie Desforges and Chelsey Saunders.

Coaching career
Along with Montreal Stars teammate Nathalie Dery, Breton was an assistant coach for the Concordia Stingers women's ice hockey team during its 2010-11 season.

Career stats

CWHL

Awards and honours

1999 Concordia University Fittest Female Athlete
2000 QSSF all-star, Second Team
2000 Concordia University Fittest Female Athlete
2001 Concordia University Fittest Female Athlete
2001 Concordia University Female Athlete of the Year (Sally Kemp Award)
2001 QSSF all-star, First Team
2001 CIAU All-Canadian
2002 Concordia University Fittest Female Athlete 
2002 QSSF all-star, Second Team
 Most Sportsmanlike Player, 2002 Esso Women's Nationals
 Breton won a gold medal at the World Roller Hockey Championships in 2006.
 2014 Isobel Gathorne Hardy Award

Personal
She graduated from Concordia with a BA in sociology. Breton is the assistant coach for the Concordia Stingers women's hockey team. She is also the strength and conditioning coach for the men and women's rugby, women's soccer and women's hockey team.

References

External links
 (French) an interview with CKAC Sports January 22, 2011 at Montreal.

1977 births
Living people
Canadian women's ice hockey forwards
Canadian women's national inline hockey team players
Clarkson Cup champions
French Quebecers
Montreal Axion players
Les Canadiennes de Montreal players
Ice hockey people from Montreal